Janick Klausen (born 3 April 1993) is a Danish high jumper.

Achievements

References

1993 births
Living people
Danish male high jumpers